Hermann Brix (1912–1982) was an Austrian stage and film actor.

Selected filmography
 Maria Ilona (1939)
 Alarm at Station III (1939)
 Der Herr im Haus (1940)
 Counterfeiters (1940)
 Titanic (1943)
 The Golden Spider (1943)
 The Master Detective (1944)
 Good Fortune in Ohio (1950)

References

Bibliography
 Goble, Alan. The Complete Index to Literary Sources in Film. Walter de Gruyter, 1999.

External links

1912 births
1982 deaths
Actors from Innsbruck
People from the County of Tyrol
Austrian male film actors
Austrian male stage actors